Schwatzkofen is a village within the municipality of Adlkofen in the district of Landshut, in Bavaria, Germany. It is situated 8 km east of Landshut.

References
Viamichelin

Landshut (district)